Hosur City Municipal Corporation is the civic body governing city of industrial hub Hosur in Tamilnadu state of India. It was the 13th Municipal corporation in Tamilnadu established on 13th february 2019. It is headed by a Mayor, who presides over a Deputy mayor, 45 councillors who represents over 45 wards of the city, and it has adjoined with Mathigiri town panchayat, Zuzuvadi, Chennathur, Avalapalli and Mookandapalli village panchayat. The annual tax revenue of the corporation is 144 crore rupees. Hosur is one of the major industrial city in Tamilnadu and had a population of 345,354 with an area of 72.41 km².

History and administration 
Hosur town was constituted as Selection grade Town Panchayat in the year 1962 and then upgraded to Second Grade Municipality in the Year 1992 and to Selection Grade Municipality in the year 1998.

Then, on 13 February 2019, Hosur Municipality was upgraded to Municipal Corporation by former Chief minister of TamilNadu Edappadi K. Palanisamy. and becomes one of the 21 municipal corporations in Tamil Nadu. It was the first corporation to be made without a district's headquarters.

At present Hosur corporation has adjoined with Mathigiri town panchayat, Zuzuvadi, Avalapalli, Chennathur and Mookandapalli village panchayat. In April 2022, plans to expand the city to 740 square kilometres were announced.

Election

The seats of the Mayor, Deputy Mayor and the corporation council of  Hosur Municipal Corporation have been vacant since 2016. As part of the 2022 Tamil Nadu urban civic body elections.  Hosur Corporation went to polling on 19 February 2022, alongside 20 other municipal corporations of Tamil Nadu, to elect 45 councillors to represent the city's 45 wards; the councillors will choose one amongst themselves as the Mayor of Hosur Corporation. The election results were announced on 22 February 2022 by the Tamil Nadu State Election Commission. Dravida Munnetra Kazhagam (DMK) won 21 out of the total 45 wards in Hosur, with the other parties in its Secular Progressive Alliance winning 1 more seat—1 for Indian National Congress. All India Anna Dravida Munnetra Kazhagam (AIADMK) won 16 seats. Bharatiya Janata Party (BJP), the ruling party of the Union Government of India, won 1 seat. Aside parties, six independent candidates won in their respective wards.

Zones

See also 

 List of municipal corporations in Tamil Nadu
 List of municipal corporations in India

References

External links 
 

Krishnagiri district 
Municipal corporations in Tamil Nadu